Daxi is a railway station on the Taiwan Railways Administration (TRA) Yilan line located in Daxi Borough, Toucheng Township, Yilan County, Taiwan.

Structure 

 The two platforms are connected with a footbridge.

Service 
 Only electric multiple units (E.M.U.) stop here.

History 
 Founded on 10 December 1920.

Nearby landmarks 
 Outer Daxi Road (Part of the Northern Seaside Highway, also known as Taiwan Highway Route 2.)
Part of Yilan County Highway Route 1). The road leads to Shuangxi District, New Taipei City, Taiwan.
 The Pacific Ocean
 The Honeymoon Bay

See also
 List of railway stations in Taiwan

References

External links 

1920 establishments in Taiwan
Railway stations in Yilan County, Taiwan
Railway stations opened in 1920
Railway stations served by Taiwan Railways Administration